is a city located in Ishikari Subprefecture, Hokkaido, Japan.

As of April 30, 2017, the city has an estimated population of 58,755, with 27,434 households, and a density of 81 persons per km2.

On October 1, 2005, the village of Atsuta, from Atsuta District, and the village of Hamamasu, from Hamamasu District, merged into Ishikari.

History
 1902: Ishikari town was founded.
 1907: Ishikari town and Hanakawa village were merged to form Ishikari town.
 1996: Ishikari town became Ishikari city.
 2005: Atsuta village and Hamamasu village were merged into Ishikari city.

Climate

Sister cities

International
  Campbell River, British Columbia, Canada (since 1983)
  Vanino, Russia (since 1993)
  Pengzhou, China (since 2000)

Domestic
 Wajima, Ishikawa (since 2012)
 Onna, Okinawa (since 2013)

Education

University
 Fuji Women's University, Hanakawa campus

High schools
 
 

It also hosts Christ for the Nations Japan bible school, an official associate of the Christ for the Nations Institute in Texas.

Mascots 

They are kappas who dressed up as salmons and loved Ishikari pot (a hotpot). They loved events that occurred in the city and all around the world (not just Japan).
Saketaro is a blue kappa. He can communicate with sea animals and humans alike. His body contains docosahexaenoic acid (the same nutrient found in fishes) which has various health benefits. As a result, he has a "DHA" tattoo on his torso. He is first discovered in 1996.
Sakeko is a pink kappa. Her body contains eicosapentaenoic acid (the same nutrient found in fishes) which smoothens blood. As a result, she wears a "EPA" dress. Her charm point is her luxurious ribbon that she wears on her head and long eyelashes. The year of her discovery is still unknown.

Notable people from Ishikari, Hokkaido
 Kazuhiro Kokubo (born 1988), Japanese snowboarder
 Taichi (born 1980), professional wrestler (Real Name: Taichiro Maki, Nihongo: 牧 太一郎, Maki Taichiro)
 Mai (born 1984), J-Pop singer (Real Name: Mai Kudo, Nihongo: 工藤 舞, Kudō Mai)
 Kengo Ishii (born 1986), Japanese football player
 Ryoya Ueda (born 1989), Japanese football player (Tokyo Musashino City FC)
 Shōtarō Tashiro (born 1989), professional Japanese baseball player (outfielder for the Tokyo Yakult Swallows)
 Yoyoka Soma (born 2009), Japanese drummer

References

External links 

Official Website 

 
Cities in Hokkaido
Port settlements in Japan
Populated coastal places in Japan